"When Did Your Heart Go Missing?" is the lead single from Los Angeles band Rooney from their second album Calling the World. It is their most successful single to date.

Charts
The song did not chart on the Billboard Hot 100, but landed at number 14 on the Bubbling Under Hot 100.

Weekly charts

Year-end charts

Music video
At the beginning of the music video, lead singer Robert Carmine's mother actress Talia Shire has a cameo. The video was directed by Benny Boom.

In films and television
The song was featured in the second episode of Gossip Girl, the ending of the film Nancy Drew, and the sixth episode of Roswell New Mexico (TV series).

References

External links

2007 singles
Music videos directed by Benny Boom
2007 songs
Geffen Records singles